Josia frigida is a moth of the family Notodontidae first described by Herbert Druce in 1885. It is found from Panama and Guatemala to southern Mexico.

External links
"Josia frigida Druce 1885". Tree of Life Web Project. Retrieved December 29, 2019.

Notodontidae
Moths described in 1885